The USSR Chess Federation was the national organization for chess in the USSR. It was founded in 1924 and its headquarters were in Moscow. It was affiliated with the World Chess Federation. The USSR Chess Federation organized a USSR Chess Championship and published a newspaper called Шахматы в СССР (Chess in the USSR).

Administration

Board 
The board consisted of a chairman, a deputy chairman, a secretary, and a treasurer.

Chairmen 
 Nikolai Krylenko (1924–1938)
 Mikhail Botvinnik (1938–1939)
 Vladimir Herman (1939–1941 and 1945–1947)
 Boris Weinstein (1942–1945)
 Vladislav Vinogradov (1947–1949, 1952–1954 and 1961–1962)
 M. Kharlamov (1949–1952)
 Vladimir Alatortsev (1954–1961)
 Boris Rodionov (1962–1968)
 Alexey Serov (1968–1969)
 Dmitry Postnikov (1969–1972)
 Yuri Averbakh (1972–1977)
 Vitaly Sevastyanov (1977–1986 and 1988–1989)
 Aleksandre Chikvaidze (1986–1988)
 Vladimir Popov (1989–1991)

Soviet chess players 
 Mikhail Botvinnik (1911–1995), chairman of the USSR Chess Federation (1938–1938) and world champion and USSR champion
 Garry Kasparov, world champion
 Anatoly Karpov, world champion
 Mikhail Tal, USSR champion and world champion
 Tigran Petrosian, world champion

See also 
 

 

Chess organizations
Chess in the Soviet Union
Chess
Sports organizations established in 1924